Jawbox is the fourth and latest album by American post hardcore band Jawbox. The album was released by TAG Recordings, a subsidiary of Atlantic Records.  In the months following the album's release, the band was dropped from TAG and thus from Atlantic.

The album is much more commercial than its predecessor, For Your Own Special Sweetheart. Music videos were produced for the tracks "Mirrorful" and Tori Amos cover "Cornflake Girl," with the latter being a hidden track. The cover became a surprise (albeit minor) hit in the alternative and college radio scene, thus the video was filmed. The cover was omitted from the album's 2015 LP reissue. Along with those two tracks, promotional singles were also created for "Absenter" and "His Only Trade."

It was Jawbox's final studio album before disbanding in 1997.

Critical reception
Trouser Press wrote: "Moody, driven and downbeat (save for the occasional sanguine moment, like the rousing 'Excandescent'), Jawbox is a work of integrity and passion from a pop band that refuses to write pop songs." Tiny Mix Tapes called the album "a masterpiece of driving, angular rock prowess."

Track listing

Personnel

Jawbox
J. Robbins - vocals, guitar, Hammond organ
Bill Barbot - guitar, Hammond organ, saxophone, vocals
Kim Coletta - bass, vocals
Zach Barocas - drums

Production
 John Agnello - producer, engineer, mixing
 Wayne Dorrell, Juan Garcia, Jeff Gatens - assistant engineers
 Jason Farrell - cover art

References 

1996 albums
Jawbox albums
DeSoto Records albums
TAG Recordings albums
Albums produced by John Agnello